Bellini is an international indie rock/math rock band, composed of members from Girls Against Boys, Soulside and Uzeda. This band was named after the Italian composer Vincenzo Bellini.

Biography 
The band was formed after Damon Che's previous band Don Caballero went on hiatus. To start a new outfit he called upon the Italian guitarist Agostino Tilotta. They were joined by Tilotta's wife Giovanna Cacciola (vocals) while Che brought in Matthew Taylor on bass. The four-piece got together with Steve Albini who produced their debut album Snowing Sun, released in 2002. During the subsequent North American tour drummer Che left and was replaced by Alexis Fleisig. In 2005 the band released the album Small Stones, followed by The Precious Prize of Gravity in 2009. Both recorded with the assistance of Steve Albini. A new record was planned for sometime in 2015.

Members
Giovanna Cacciola - vocals
Alexis Fleisig - drums
Matthew Taylor - bass
Agostino Tilotta - guitar
Damon Che - drums (2001—2002)

Official releases
Snowing Sun, (Monitor Records, Palace Records, 2002)
Small Stones, (Temporary Residence Limited, 2005)
The Buffalo Song/Never Again 7" single (Radio is Down, 2004)
The Precious Prize of Gravity, (Temporary Residence Limited, 2009)
Before The Day Has Gone, (Temporary Residence Limited, 2018)

References

External links
Official Site
MySpace Site
Temporary Residence Limited

Italian rock music groups
Italian indie rock groups
Art rock musical groups
Italian post-rock groups
Musical groups established in 2004
Temporary Residence Limited artists